Albany Technical College (Albany Tech or ATC) is a public  community college in Albany, Georgia. It is part of the Technical College System of Georgia and provides education services for a seven-county service area in southwest Georgia. The school's service area includes Baker, Calhoun, Clay, Dougherty, Lee, Randolph, and Terrell counties. ATC is accredited by the Commission on Colleges of the Southern Association of Colleges and Schools to award Associate of Applied Science Degrees. The ATC Medical Assisting Program is also accredited by the Commission on Accreditation of Allied Health Education Programs (www.caahep.org) upon the recommendation of the Medical Assisting Education Review Board (MAERB).

History

Albany Tech traces its roots back to the establishment of the Monroe Area Vocational-Technical School, which first opened its doors in 1961 with a class of 175 students. In 1972, Monroe Area Vocational-Technical School was merged with Albany Area Vocational-Technical School, keeping the Albany name.  The school's campus was moved to its current location during the merger.

In 1988, the school was renamed Albany Technical Institute and placed under the direction of the newly formed TCSG (then-named the Department of Technical and Adult Education). Albany Tech was charged at this time with providing technical education opportunities to the residents, businesses and industries within the seven-county service delivery area it currently serves.

Following the passage of Georgia House Bill 1187 governing the names of units in the TCSG, Albany Technical Institute was officially renamed Albany Technical College on July 6, 2000.

Locations
Albany Tech's primary campus is located at 1704 South Slappey Blvd. in Albany, Georgia.  There are also adult learning centers in all seven of ATC's service delivery counties.

Athletics
Albany Tech currently sponsors intercollegiate men's and women's basketball teams.  The school's teams are nicknamed the Titans, and participate in Division I of the National Junior College Athletic Association (NJCAA) and the Georgia Collegiate Athletic Association (GCAA) conference.

Notable alumni
Phillip Phillips – American Idol season 11 winner
Kylie Sonique Love – RuPaul's Drag Race season 2 and All Stars 6 competitor

See also

References

Buildings and structures in Albany, Georgia
Education in Baker County, Georgia
Education in Calhoun County, Georgia
Education in Clay County, Georgia
Education in Dougherty County, Georgia
Education in Lee County, Georgia
Education in Randolph County, Georgia
Education in Terrell County, Georgia
1961 establishments in Georgia (U.S. state)
Educational institutions established in 1961
Universities and colleges accredited by the Southern Association of Colleges and Schools
Technical College System of Georgia